Adinassa barcai is a species of sea snail, a marine gastropod mollusk in the family Nassariidae, the Nassa mud snails or dog whelks.

Description
The length of the shell attains 29.6 mm.

Distribution
This marine species occurs off Angola at depths between 40 m and 50 m.

References

Two new Nassariidae (Gastropoda) from West Africa with the substitution of Adinopsis Odhner, 1923 by Adinassa n. nom. Conchylia. 49(3-4): 25–34.

Endemic fauna of Angola
barcai
Gastropods described in 2018